Lomilysis was a genus of moths of the family Noctuidae. It was a monotypic genus. The single species of the genus Lomilysis discolor, is now known as Brachylomia discolor.

References
Natural History Museum Lepidoptera genus database
A revision of the North American species of Brachylomia (Lepidoptera: Noctuidae: Xyleninae) with descriptions of four new species

Cuculliinae